"Arcadia" is the fifteenth episode of the sixth season of the American science fiction television series The X-Files. It premiered on the Fox network on March 7, 1999. The episode was written by Daniel Arkin and directed by Michael Watkins. The episode is a "Monster-of-the-Week" story, unconnected to the series' wider mythology. "Arcadia" earned a Nielsen household rating of 10.5, being watched by 17.91 million people in its initial broadcast. The episode received mostly positive critical reception, with many reviewers praising the episode's humor.

The show centers on FBI special agents Fox Mulder (David Duchovny) and Dana Scully (Gillian Anderson) who work on cases linked to the paranormal, called X-Files. Mulder is a believer in the paranormal, while the skeptical Scully has been assigned to debunk his work. In this episode, several disappearances at an idyllic planned community lead Mulder and Scully to go undercover as a married couple. They find that the members of the community strictly abide by every single subdivision rule, no matter how inconsequential a rule may seem. What Mulder and Scully soon discover is that the ruler of this small community has enforced his rule with a Tulpa creature from Tibet.

Arkin, a first-year staff writer for the show, was inspired to write the episode based on an incident in his life that involved a planned community. The episode heavily utilized special effects, with various make-up and digital effects inserted into the final film to give the episode an appropriate feel.

Plot

At the Falls of Arcadia, a fictional planned community in San Diego County, California, disgruntled homeowner Dave Kline arrives at home to find a package from an unknown person. The package contains a tacky whirligig, which Kline puts on his roof to annoy the neighbors. While in bed that night, Kline hears an intruder in the house. He goes to investigate while his wife, Nancy, stays in bed. A mysterious creature attacks and kills the Klines.

Fox Mulder (David Duchovny) and Dana Scully (Gillian Anderson) investigate the Klines' disappearance, going undercover as new homeowners under the aliases Rob and Laura Petrie. As Mulder and Scully are moving into the Klines' former home, neighbor Win Shroeder nervously tucks away Mulder's basketball hoop into the garage, telling him that it is against the community's CC&Rs. Settling in, the agents begin searching the house and find what appears to be blood on a blade of the ceiling fan. When Big Mike, another neighbor, wants to let the "Petries" in on the "consequences" of breaking the CC&Rs, homeowner association president Gene Gogolak describes him as "a weak link" to be dealt with. That night, Big Mike disappears after being attacked by the creature. While taking a walk, Scully later finds the Schroeder's dog Scruffy and Big Mike's necklace in a storm drain. Scruffy's face is covered in a substance that looks like blood.

Mulder and Scully discuss possible motives for the Klines' presumed murders, and Scully decides to have the substances analyzed in San Diego. Mulder decides to test his theories that noncompliance with the CC&Rs is the motive by sticking a plastic flamingo in the yard and damaging the mailbox, among other antics. Mulder later finds a note in the mailbox that says, "Be like the others... before it gets dark". After dark, Mulder brings out his basketball hoop, and Shroeder runs over to frantically argue with Mulder to put it away. Meanwhile, something comes out of the grass at Mrs. Shroeder, who screams. Mulder chases it away, but they all notice their light has burned out.

Shroeder confronts Gogolak, accusing him of trying to kill his family. Instead Schroeder is told "Rob Petrie" is the real problem. Meanwhile, Mulder believes the creature that kills the homeowners moves through the yard, under the grass. Scully shares her lab results: the "blood" on the ceiling fan and on the dog is actually grime, as the neighborhood is built on top of an old landfill. Mulder believes the Klines were buried in their front yard, so the next day he gets a backhoe to dig it up, telling the neighbors he's putting in a reflecting pool, which is not against the CC&Rs. They don't find the Klines, but they do find the tacky whirligig that had been mysteriously delivered to the Klines before they died. The whirligig bears a label from Gogolak's company.

As Scully calls for a forensic team to come out there immediately, she hears something in the house. She goes for her gun in the dresser drawer, but finds it missing. As the creature comes up the stairs, a bloodied Big Mike grabs Scully and tells her to get out, that "it's coming" for her. He shoves Scully in the closet, and fights with the creature. Meanwhile, Mulder confronts Gogolak about marking the Klines for death by giving them the tacky whirligig. Mulder says the creature is a tulpa, a Tibetan thoughtform, that Gogolak conjured to assure compliance with the CC&Rs. Mulder arrests him, handcuffs him to a mailbox, and goes to find Scully. Cuffed to the mailbox, Gogolak begs for help, knowing the creature is coming. The creature attacks Gogolak and, as he dies, it disintegrates into dirt. Scully comes outside too late to see the creature, the remnants of which are at Mulder's feet.

Production

Inspiration and writing

Daniel Arkin, a first year staff writer for the show, was inspired to write "Arcadia" based on an incident that had occurred several years prior: In 1991, he had moved into an "uptight planned communit[y]" in Greenwich Village. Unfortunately, his movers showed up late, forcing him to begin unloading his belongings in the later part of the evening. Because Arkin had neglected to read the community's "three hundred page" long covenants, conditions, and restrictions, he was later shocked to discover that the complex had fined him one thousand dollars for moving in after the approved hours. The incident stuck in Arkin's mind, and when he was tasked with writing a story for The X-Files, he immediately jumped to the "frightening" reality of planned communities.

The story went through many variations, and when Arkin wrote his first draft, the main antagonist was simply a man who served as a metaphorical "bogeyman." After series creator Chris Carter suggested that Arkin replace the human with an actual monster, he quickly re-wrote his story to include elements of the Tulpa myth. The idea to "marry" Mulder and Scully came from a writers meeting, as everyone felt it would be a convincing way for Mulder and Scully to go undercover.

Casting and design
Abraham Benrubi, noted at the time for his work as Jerry Markovic on the NBC hospital drama ER, was cast by Rick Millikan to play Big Mike. The NBC production staff was hesitant to allow him to appear on the show, given his tight production schedule, but, as Millikan later explained, "there was a small window—he had a few days off—and we were able to squeeze him in there."

Cheri Montesanto-Medcalf, the make-up department head for The X-Files, was responsible for making Benrubi appear mauled and bloody. Applying the necessary makeup and prosthetics took four hours, and Benrubi wore his makeup for almost twelve hours straight. Costume designer Christine Peters was tasked with designing the outfits for Mulder and Scully. Mulder's outfit was composed largely of "Lacoste Izod alligator shirts, Dockers, Bass Weejuns," and Scully's outfit was "jeans and a sweatshirt [or] khakis and sneakers." Peters noted that Scully's outfit was harder to design because Scully's character has "a 'look' that she doesn't want to give up."

Effects

The show's production crew had a difficult time designing the monster, which later earned a variety of colorful nicknames courtesy of the show's production staff, including "Gumby on Steroids," "Mr. Butterworth," "Fecal Fred," and "The Shit Monster.". Assistant director Bruce Carter explained that the two choices were either to make a creature that "has grown muscle and sinew through the force of Gene Gogolak's personality", or make a more conventional garbage creature covered in "banana peels and coffee grounds." Makeup supervisor John Vulich eventually designed a monster outfit that was, effectively, a "foam rubber suit" made out of urethane. Shredded rubber was then attached to the suit, which was then submerged in "gunk" to create the garbage effect. Despite all this work, the final episode does not contain many shots of the monster, as most of its scenes were cut during the editing phase.

Digital effects supervisor Bill Millar was tasked to edit Scully's "evidence video". He explained that "they wanted Scully's point of view rather than the Handicam's point of view." Unfortunately, he was given the film the Friday before the episode aired. The complete special effects for just this short video required roughly six hours to complete.

Reception

Ratings
"Arcadia" premiered on the Fox network on March 7, 1999. This episode earned a Nielsen rating of 10.5, with a 16 share, meaning that roughly 10.5 percent of all television-equipped households, and 16 percent of households watching television, were tuned in to the episode. It was viewed by 17.91 million viewers. The episode aired in the United Kingdom and Ireland on Sky1 on June 20, 1999, and received 1.02 million viewers, making it the most watched episode that week. Fox promoted the episode with the tagline "Mulder and Scully married! This could be the scariest 'X-Files' ever!"

Reviews
"Arcadia" received mostly positive reviews from critics. Rob Bricken from Topless Robot named "Arcadia" the tenth funniest X-Files episode and noted the two levels of humor in the episode—the "blatantly hilarious" pairing of Mulder and Scully as husband and wife, and the "perfect parody" of the planned community way of life. Timothy Sexton from Yahoo! News named "The Arcadia Garbage Monster" as one of "The Best X-Files Monsters of the Week". Robert Shearman and Lars Pearson, in their book Wanting to Believe: A Critical Guide to The X-Files, Millennium & The Lone Gunmen, rated the episode four stars out of five and noted that the inherent draw of the episode was "seeing Mulder and Scully go under-cover as a yuppie married couple." Despite the general praise for the episode, however, the two slightly criticized the ending, calling the final scene "rushed."

Emily VanDerWerff of The A.V. Club awarded the episode a "B+" and called it "a solid example of the show’s mid-period form". However, she noted that the episode is not one of the series bests, unlike the way many fans portray it—due largely to the fact that "it allows us to see what it would be like if Mulder and Scully were a happily married couple"—and that "the episode’s monster is a little hard to figure out".

Tom Kessenich, in his book Examination: An Unauthorized Look at Seasons 6–9 of the X-Files gave the episode a more mixed review, writing "after watching 'Arcadia', I feel like I just had a couple slices of pizza for dinner on Thanksgiving. Not bad, but hardly the feast I have come to expect." Paula Vitaris from Cinefantastique gave the episode a mixed review and awarded it two stars out of four. Vitaris, despite praising David Duchovny's performance during the scenes wherein he "rebels against the rules", called the episode's main villains "stereotypes of self-indulgent, insulated suburbanites."

In the 1999 FX Thanksgiving Marathon, containing fan-selected episodes, "Arcadia" was presented as the "Best Mulder/Scully Chemistry".

Footnotes

Bibliography

External links

 

1999 American television episodes
Television episodes set in San Diego
The X-Files (season 6) episodes